Inday Inday sa Balitaw is a 1986 Philippine comedy film directed by Luciano Carlos and written by Pablo S. Gomez, with screenplay by Jose Javier Reyes.

Plot 
The story revolves around Inday (Maricel Soriano), a beautiful and persevering girl who was abandoned by her mother during her childhood. She despised her mother, but due to her longing for motherly love, Inday can’t help but feel drawn to Monina (Susan Roces), a longing mother. However their relationship was cut short due to unexpected circumstances.

Cast 
 Susan Roces as Monina Rosales
 Eddie Gutierrez as Danny 
 Maricel Soriano as Maria Luisa Rosario "Inday" Rosales
 William Martinez as Cleto 
 Matet De Leon as Tiyanak 
 Armida Siguion-Reyna as Isabel Pabustan
 Roderick Paulate as Tonette
 Lucita Soriano as Doray
 Cynthia Patag as Chita
 Flora Gasser
 Metring David
 Dencio Padilla

Production 
The film was produced by Regal Films, and color processing was done by LVN Pictures. All the filming facilities and post-production  was provided by Regal Films and was released on 28 August 1986.

References

External links 
 

Films directed by Luciano B. Carlos